Zigmund John "Red" Mihalik (September 22, 1916 – September 25, 1996) was an American basketball player and referee of Polish descent. He was inducted into the Naismith Memorial Basketball Hall of Fame in 1986.

He was born 30 miles north of Pittsburgh in Ford City, Pennsylvania, and took up refereeing when officials for a high school game failed to show up.  During the 1940s, the 6'1" Mihalik played professionally for the Pittsburgh Ironmen of the Basketball Association of America and the Youngstown Bears of the National Basketball League.  He then embarked upon a long officiating career, working games for the NBA, NCAA, Summer Olympics.  Mihalik was deemed the best official of the game on all levels in the 1950s by Dell Publications.  He was widely considered just that until an on-court knee injury forced him into retirement in 1972. Mihalik was inducted into the National Polish-American Sports Hall of Fame in 1996.

BAA career statistics

Regular season

References

External links

Basketball Hall of Fame profile
National Polish-American Hall of Fame profile

1916 births
1996 deaths
American men's basketball players
American people of Polish descent
Basketball players from Pennsylvania
Guards (basketball)
Naismith Memorial Basketball Hall of Fame inductees
National Basketball Association referees
People from Ford City, Pennsylvania
Pittsburgh Ironmen players
Youngstown Bears players